Gutmann may refer to:

 Gutmann (surname), including a list of people with the name
 Bank Gutmann, a private bank in Vienna, Austria
 Gutmann method, an algorithm used to erase the contents of a computer drive, invented by Peter Gutmann
 Palais Gutmann, a Ringstraßenpalais in Vienna

See also 
 Gutman
 Guttmann
 Guttman